Röschitz is a village in the district of Horn in Lower Austria, Austria.

Population

References

External links

Cities and towns in Horn District